Chwilog railway station served the village of Chwilog, Gwynedd, Wales. It was opened in 1867 by the Carnarvonshire Railway, who were subsequently taken over by the LNWR, passing to the LMSR at the Grouping of 1923. The station came under the London Midland Region of British Railways from nationalisation in 1948.

A year after the station opened £100 was spent improving its passenger accommodation.

Apart from goods and passenger services normal for a country station, a strong milk traffic was developed, culminating in a train of five vans of churns being sent to Liverpool daily from 1943 to 1949. The siding at Chwilog could only accommodate five vans, so the opportunity to expand the business was lost to road traffic in winter 1949–50.

The line and station closed in December 1964.

In 2015 the station area was covered by a bus station, but the platform was still in place behind a new housing estate and the station master's house was in use as a private residence.

References

Sources

Further material

External links
 
 
 
 
 
 

Beeching closures in Wales
Disused railway stations in Gwynedd
Railway stations in Great Britain opened in 1867
Railway stations in Great Britain closed in 1964
Former London and North Western Railway stations
Llanystumdwy
1867 establishments in Wales
1964 disestablishments in Wales